The 2019 Perlis season is the club 1st season in Malaysian football after rebranded as Perlis Northern Lions Football Club.

Management team

Players
The number of foreign players is restricted to four each team including at least one player from the AFC country.

Transfers

In

Competitions

Malaysia Premier League

League table

Results by round

Matches

Statistics

Appearances and goals

|-
! colspan="16" style="background:#dcdcdc; text-align:center"| Goalkeepers

	
|-
! colspan="16" style="background:#dcdcdc; text-align:center"| Defenders
|-

	
	
	

	

	

|-
! colspan="16" style="background:#dcdcdc; text-align:center"| Midfielders
|-

	

|-
! colspan="16" style="background:#dcdcdc; text-align:center"| Forwards
|-

|-
! colspan="16" style="background:#dcdcdc; text-align:center"| Players transferred out during the season
|-

References

Perlis FA
Malaysian football clubs 2019 season